is a railway station in the town of Ishikawa, Fukushima, Japan operated by East Japan Railway Company (JR East).

Lines

Station layout
The station has a single side platform and an island platform connected to the station building by a level crossing. The station has a Midori no Madoguchi staffed ticket office.

Platforms

History
Iwaki-Ishikawa Station opened on December 4, 1934. The station was absorbed into the JR East network upon the privatization of the Japanese National Railways (JNR) on April 1, 1987.

Passenger statistics
In fiscal 2018, the station was used by an average of 518 passengers daily (boarding passengers only).

Surrounding area
Ishikawa Town Hall
Ishikawa Post Office
Nekonaki Onsen
Katakura Onsen
Bohata Onsen

See also
 List of Railway Stations in Japan

References

External links

   

Stations of East Japan Railway Company
Railway stations in Fukushima Prefecture
Suigun Line
Railway stations in Japan opened in 1934
Ishikawa, Fukushima